Pacita Complex National High School (PCNHS), also known as Pacita NHS, is a public secondary high school in San Pedro, Laguna, in the Philippines. It was founded on 13 November 1997, began offering education in 1999, and now runs a curriculum in science, technology, and engineering program and secondary basic education.

History
PCNHS currently has its two branches, both located at San Vicente, San Pedro, Laguna. As of SY 2019–2020, the Main Branch is located at Brgy. Pacita 1, while the Extension Branch is located at Brgy. Pacita 2.

As a young school, it is facing several major problems: One is insufficient resources. Though it has an organized library, the reference materials are not enough for the demands of the students and teachers. Moreover, the school adopted AM-PM sessions, wherein classes are done in two shifts because of limited classrooms and teachers.

Since school year 2018–2019, the school has launched the "Co/Duo Teaching" program aimed to improve teaching experience due to the rise of the number of the school's enrollees. Issued at Grade 9 and 10 BEC Curriculum the students have two homeroom advisers and two subject teachers as well. An average of 70 students per classroom is divided into two groups (A & B) in order to ease the handling of their student's records. If the program proves successful it will be made permanent. This program has now been discontinued for school year 2022-2023.

During the COVID-19 pandemic, the school has stopped face-to-face classes in March of 2020, where the country experiences an increase in cases, resulting to the country's first lockdown. The school had no choice but to pass every student. As the school faces their first distance school year in school year 2020-2021, students have the freedom to choose their learning modalities: whether through online (students can be taught by their teachers through online platforms) or modular distance learning (students will be given hard copies of their modules to self-learn them at home, or be taught by their parents or guardian). This implementation continued until school year 2021-2022. On school year 2022-2023, when the country eased its restrictions, the school now reopens for blended face-to-face (during the first two months), and now full face-to-face.

Science, Technology, and Engineering and Mathematics Program (STEM-P)
The school accepts aspiring STEM students as early as Grade 7. It starts with the acceptance of students who are longing to be a part of the program. Next is the test period. Here, the students will be given 2-3 sets of tests, namely the Mental Ability Test and the Admission Test (Due to the ongoing COVID-19 pandemic, the coordinators have decided to make 2 separate tests for the Admission Test). Finally, they will be given an interview (for both the student and the parent). The school will then accept the Top 105 students that made the mark.  

Science and Technology – As a Science and Math-Oriented Program, PCNHS offers special courses in Science. Grade 7 take Integrated Science and Environmental Science or Earth Science for elective; Grade 8 take Biological Science and Research 1 for electives; Grade 9 take Chemistry as a major subject, Physics and Biotechnology for electives; and Grade 10 take Advanced Physics as major while Advanced Chemistry and Research 2 for electives.
Mathematics – Grade 7 take Elementary Algebra. Grade 8 covers Geometry as a major while Intermediate Algebra and Basic Statistics for elective. Grade 9 study Advanced Algebra, Analytic Geometry as majors, and Advanced Statistics for Elective. Grade 10 take Trigonometry and Introduction to Calculus.
English – Grade 7 English course focuses more on grammar, composition writing and Philippine Literature and Developmental Reading for Elective. Grade 8 study the literature of Asia and Africa, as well as advanced topics in communication arts and grammar. They are also taught about the Indian literature Ramayana of Valmiki, which tells the story of Rama's journey to save his wife, Sita against King Ravana of Lanka with the help of his brother and an army of monkeys. Grade 9 focuses more on reading and comprehension using literary pieces from American and English literature. Grade 10 is taught English in terms of real-world applications, such as job interviews, plays, and literary criticisms.
Filipino – The Filipino program for Grade 7 students discusses the characteristics of the Filipino language and grammar lessons. Ang Ibong Adarna is the piece of literature taught for the fourth quarter. Grade 8 students, take up Florante at Laura of Francisco Balagtas. Grade 9 students study literary criticism with various literary pieces taken from different regions of the Philippines and a special topic for José Rizal’s Noli me Tangere. Grade 10 students step on advanced literary criticism. They study Rizal’s El Filibusterismo.
Social Studies – Grade 7 begins their social studies course with Geography and Asian History. Grade 8 tackles World History. Grade 9 studies Economics in relation to Philippines' economic status, and Geography. Grade 10 takes Contemporary History.
Research – Subject courses in Research are only offered to Grade 7 to Grade 10 STEM students and not for the students of Basic Education Curriculum or BEC. Grade 7 students are offered the practice of producing a research paper. Grade 8 is offered basic theoretic principles in research, and the creation of a Research Paper from Chapters 1 to 3 or from the introduction to the RRL or Review of Related Literature. Grade 10 is given advanced applied principles in research and Thesis Writing. Students are required to conduct their own research study and defense is required at the end of their course.
Technology and Livelihood Education (TLE) – Only Grade 7 through 10 students of BEC are offered by this subject, and not STEM students. Grade 7 take Basic Computer Education and Microsoft Office. Grade 8 takes Computer Education, The Internet, and Photo Editing. Grade 9 take HTML and Web Page Designing. Grade 10 takes Computer Education and Programming.
Values Education (ESP) – All year levels about values enrichment and community.
Music and Arts – Grade 7 take Basic Music Elements and Southeast Asian Music. Grade 8 take Asian Music, while Grade 9 and 10 take World Music and some topics in European Music.
Physical Education and Health – Students take various physical education topics and sports. And in health, Students study health and drug awareness, reproductive health, etc.
Journalism – A special group which is offered for Grades 7 to 10. The English Publication is named The Dove and in Filipino, Ang Dalisay.

HS Level and Sections (Science Curriculum)

Paciklaban
	
Paciklaban is a celebration during the school's annual Foundation Day. It is portmanteau between the Filipino word, pasiklaban, meaning "show down", and Pacitians, the school's nickname. It is the highlight event during the celebration of the founding anniversary. This is to showcase the talents of Pacitians in singing, dancing and playing Instruments. Unfortunately, the Paciklaban is still cancelled starting in 2020, due to COVID-19, as of school year 2022-2023.

Categories
 Singing Contest
 Solo
 Duet
 Group
Dance Contest
 Interpretative Dance
 Social Dance
 Modern Dance
 Folk Dance
 Battle of the Bands

Principals

 Maura M. Umaclap (1999-2004)
 Reynaldo D. Villaluz (2005-2017)
 Sonia J. Alvero (2018-2023)
 Reginal G. Grafil (2023- )

School publications
The Dove and Ang Dalisay are the official newspapers of the school. The organization equips the students to enhance journalistic skills. The school is known for excellence in radio script writing and broadcasting in the Division of Laguna. For two consecutive years, PCNHS hailed as Champion in radio script writing and broadcasting Filipino category during the conduct of Division Secondary Schools Press Conference (DSSPC) 2013 and 2014 while the English category placed third during the DSSPC 2014. This marked PCNHS as warriors in radio broadcasting. Furthermore, PCNHS excels in individual categories such as news writing, editorial writing, editorial cartooning, copyreading and headline writing, sports writing.

References

Science high schools in the Philippines
Schools in San Pedro, Laguna
High schools in Laguna (province)